Lorraine Robin Taylor (born 20 September 1961) is a former association football player who represented New Zealand at international level.

Taylor made her Football Ferns debut in a 0–2 loss to Australia on 26 March 1989 and ended her international career with 22 caps to her credit.

Taylor represented New Zealand at the Women's World Cup finals in China in 1991 playing all 3 group games; a 0–3 loss to Denmark, a 0–4 loss to Norway and a 1–4 loss to China.

References

External links

1961 births
Living people
New Zealand women's international footballers
New Zealand women's association footballers
1991 FIFA Women's World Cup players
Women's association football midfielders